{{safesubst:#invoke:RfD|||month = March
|day = 20
|year = 2023
|time = 14:30
|timestamp = 20230320143004

|content=
redirectNormative principle of worship

}}